Chan Varyam is a 1981 Pakistani action film. Directed by Jahangir Qaisar and produced by Mohammad Sarwar Bhatti, the film stars Sultan Rahi, Anjuman, Iqbal Hassan, Mustafa Qureshi, Afzaal Ahmed, Humayun Qureshi and Mehboob Alam.

Release
Chann Varyam was the third big film released on Eid-day, August 2, 1981.

Cast

 Sultan Rahi
 Anjuman
 Iqbal Hassan
 Mustafa Qureshi
 Shugafta
 Afzaal Ahmed
 Humayun Qureshi
 Nasrullah Butt
 Altaf Khan
 Zahir Shah
 Sawan
 Gul Zaman
 Sikkedar
 Ajmal

Guest appearances by actors
 Ilyas Kashmiri
 Hanif
 Mehboob Alam

Awards
Won a Nigar Award in 1981 for Best Script.

Track list
The soundtrack was composed by the musician Wajahat Attre, with lyrics by Hazin Qadri and sung by Noor Jehan and Mehnaz.

References

External links
 

Pakistani biographical films
1980s crime action films
Pakistani crime action films
1981 films
Punjabi-language Pakistani films
Nigar Award winners
1980s Punjabi-language films